The 1979 Can-Am season was the twelfth running of the Sports Car Club of America's prototype-based series and the third running of the revived series. Formula One legend Jacky Ickx was declared champion, winning five of the ten rounds and finishing second at Road Atlanta. Chevrolet again dominated the season. The top chassis builders were Lola, Prophet, and Spyder, with Vern Schuppan finishing third at Watkins Glen in an Elfin and Al Holbert finishing third at Road America in a Hogan.

1979 would also mark the introduction of a second class for prototypes with engines under 2000cc. That class was won by Tim Evans in his Lola T290.

Results
Points are awarded to the top six finishers in the order of 9-6-4-3-2-1.

References

Can-Am
Can-Am seasons
Can-Am
Can-Am